The 1964 ECAC Hockey Men's Ice Hockey Tournament was the 3rd tournament in league history. It was played between March 6 and March 14, 1964. Quarterfinal games were played at home team campus sites, while the 'final four' games were played at the Boston Arena in Boston, Massachusetts. By reaching the championship game Providence was invited to participate in the 1964 NCAA Men's Ice Hockey Tournament. St. Lawrence, however, was passed over with Rensselaer chosen instead as the second eastern representative.

Format
The tournament featured three rounds of play, all of which were single-elimination. The top eight teams, based on conference rankings, qualified to participate in the tournament. In the quarterfinals the first seed and eighth seed, the second seed and seventh seed, the third seed and sixth seed and the fourth seed and fifth seed played against one another. In the semifinals, the winner of the first and eighth matchup played the winner of the fourth and fifth matchup while the other two remaining teams played with the winners advancing to the championship game and the losers advancing to the third place game.

Conference standings
Note: GP = Games played; W = Wins; L = Losses; T = Ties; Pct. = Winning percentage; GF = Goals for; GA = Goals against

Bracket

Note: * denotes overtime period(s)

Quarterfinals

(1) Providence vs. (8) Colgate

(2) Army vs. (7) St. Lawrence

(3) Boston College vs. (6) Rensselaer

(4) Clarkson vs. (5) Harvard

Semifinals

(1) Providence vs. (4) Clarkson

(6) Rensselaer vs. (7) St. Lawrence

Third Place

(4) Clarkson vs. (6) Rensselaer

Championship

(1) Providence vs. (7) St. Lawrence

Tournament awards

All-Tournament Team

First Team
F Jerry Knightley (Rensselaer)
F Bob Brinkworth (Rensselaer)
F Ray Mooney (Providence)
D Larry Kish (Providence)
D Jim Salfi (St. Lawrence)
G Bob Perani* (St. Lawrence)
* Most Outstanding Player(s)

Second Team
F Corby Adams (Clarkson)
F John Keough (Providence)
F Grant Heffernan (Providence)
D Bill Grisdale (Rensselaer)
D Fred Kitchen (Rensselaer)
G Bill Sack (Rensselaer)

References

External links
ECAC Hockey
1963–64 ECAC Hockey Standings
1963–64 NCAA Standings

ECAC Hockey Men's Ice Hockey Tournament
ECAC tournament